Ernst Soudek (born 30 September 1940) is an Austrian athlete. He competed in the men's discus throw at the 1964 Summer Olympics.

References

1940 births
Living people
Athletes (track and field) at the 1964 Summer Olympics
Austrian male discus throwers
Olympic athletes of Austria
Place of birth missing (living people)